is a Japanese manga series written and illustrated by Akira Toriyama. It was originally serialized in Weekly Shōnen Jump in 1998, with the twelve chapters collected into a single tankōbon volume by Shueisha. Although it has not been licensed for an English language release, Kajika has been translated and published in several European territories.

Plot
Kajika is the story of the title protagonist and his quest to return to being a normal boy. As a child, Kajika was very evil. His greatest known evil was chasing after a defenseless fox and smashing it with a giant rock. Upon being killed, the spirit of the fox cursed Kajika and Kajika was turned into a fox-man. Kajika was then kicked out of his village because of his monstrous appearance, and the only way to break the curse was to save the lives of 1,000 life forms. The spirit of the dead fox, named Gigi, decided to accompany Kajika on his journey. Upon saving 1,000 life forms, Kajika will go back to being a boy and Gigi will once again get its body back.

After five years of saving life forms, the team only has ten more lives to save. One day, Kajika runs across a girl and saves her from a gang of bad guys. After defeating the gang, Kajika then uses a special power to remove all of their evil, turning them good. Kajika learns that the girl he saved is named Haya, and is told that the guys were after her because of the Dragon Egg she possesses. Haya then went to Sumakia and stole it from Gibachi. She then went on a quest to return the egg. Gibachi tries to kill Haya and recover the egg. Haya then asks Kajika to help her on her quest.

As the three go to Ronron island we are told why Gibachi wants the egg so badly. There is an old saying that says if you drink the blood of a young Dragon, then you will gain incredible powers. No one is sure if this is true, but the baby dragon does have Dragomin in its blood which allows it to mature extremely fast. As the three set off, though, Haya makes up an excuse as to why she can not continue, but it is really because she fears Gibachi. So, now it is up to Kajika and Giri to return the egg, but it will not be so easy now that they are being hunted down by the world-famous assassin known as Isaza, who is also a member of the powerful Kawa tribe. Kajika is an extremely strong boy, but it is also revealed that being turned into a fox-man is holding down his true powers.

Characters

Media

Manga
Written and illustrated by Akira Toriyama, Kajika was serialized in Weekly Shōnen Jump magazine from issue #32 to #44 of 1998. The twelve chapters were collected into one tankōbon volume that was released on January 8, 1999 by Shueisha.

Kajika has been translated and released in foreign countries, such as in France by Glénat, Spain by Planeta DeAgostini, Malaysia by Comics House, Finland by Sangatsu Manga, and in Germany, Sweden and Denmark by Carlsen Verlag.

Chapter list

Reception 
Animerica Extra columnist Patricia Duffield stated that Kajika was regularly stocked in Japanese bookstores within the United States. She described Kajika as a highly entertaining adventure story due to Toriyama's easy-to-follow writing and comic style and for possessing "the art of a master of action".

References

External links

1998 manga
Adventure anime and manga
Akira Toriyama
Comedy anime and manga
Dragons in popular culture
Shōnen manga
Shueisha manga